Neith Nunatak is a nunatak 3 nautical miles (6 km) north of Baker Ridge in northern Neptune Range, Pensacola Mountains. Mapped by United States Geological Survey (USGS) from surveys and U.S. Navy air photos, 1956–66. Named by Advisory Committee on Antarctic Names (US-ACAN) for Willard Neith, photographer with the Electronic Test Unit in the Pensacola Mountains, 1957–58.

Nunataks of Queen Elizabeth Land